Edward Howell (October 16, 1792 – January 30, 1871) was an American educator, lawyer, and politician who served one term as a U.S. Representative from New York state from 1833 to 1835.

Biography 
Born in Newburgh, New York, Howell attended the public schools.
He moved to Sidney, New York, in 1808, and in the following year to Unadilla, New York, where he taught school.
He moved to Bath, New York, in 1811.

He was appointed postmaster of Bath December 30, 1817, and served until August 13, 1821.
County clerk of Steuben County in 1818–1821.
He studied law.
He was admitted to the bar in 1823 and commenced practice in Bath.

Political career 
He served as district attorney of Steuben County in 1829–1834.
He served as member of the State assembly in 1832.

Congress 
Howell was elected as a Jacksonian to the Twenty-third Congress (March 4, 1833 – March 3, 1835).
He was not a candidate for renomination in 1834.

Later career and death 
He served as again district attorney of Steuben County in 1836–1840.
He resumed the practice of law.

He died in Bath, New York, January 30, 1871.
He was interred in Grove Cemetery.

Sources

1792 births
1871 deaths
American people of Welsh descent
Jacksonian members of the United States House of Representatives from New York (state)
19th-century American politicians
Politicians from Newburgh, New York
People from Bath, New York
People from Unadilla, New York
Steuben County district attorneys
Members of the United States House of Representatives from New York (state)